IEC 61968  is a series of standards under development that will define standards for information exchanges between electrical distribution systems. These standards are being developed by Working Group 14 of Technical Committee 57 of the IEC (IEC TC 57 WG14). IEC 61968 is intended to support the inter-application integration of a utility enterprise that needs to collect data from different applications that are legacy or new and each has different interfaces and run-time environments. IEC 61968 defines interfaces for all the major elements of an interface architecture for Distribution Management Systems (DMS) and is intended to be implemented with middleware services that broker messages among applications.

Standards
 IEC 61968-1 – Interface architecture and general requirements [Published]
 IEC 61968-2 – Glossary [Published]
 IEC 61968-3 – Interface for Network Operations [NO] [Published]
 IEC 61968-4 – Interfaces for Records and Asset management [AM] [Published]
 IEC 61968-5  – Interfaces for Distributed Energy Optimization [DER] [Under Development]
 IEC 61968-6 – Interfaces for Maintenance & Construction [MC] [Published]
 IEC 61968-7 – Interfaces for Network Extension Planning [NE] [Under Development]
 IEC 61968-8 – Interfaces for Customer Support [CS] [Published]
 IEC 61968-9 – Interface Standard for Meter Reading & Control [MR] [Published]
 IEC 61968-10 – Interfaces for Business functions external to distribution management [Retired]. This includes Energy management & trading [EMS], Retail [RET], Supply Chain & Logistics [SC], Customer Account Management [ACT], Financial [FIN], Premises [PRM] & Human Resources [HR]
 IEC 61968-11 – Common Information Model (CIM) Extensions for Distribution [Published]
 IEC 61968-12 – Common Information Model (CIM) Use Cases for 61968 [Retired]
 IEC 61968-13 – Common Information Model (CIM) RDF Model exchange format for distribution [Published]
 IEC 61968-14-1-3 to 14-1-10  – Proposed IEC Standards to Map IEC61968 and MultiSpeak Standards [Under Development]
 IEC 61968-14-2-3 to 14-2-10 – Proposed IEC Standards to Create a CIM Profile to Implement MultiSpeak Functionality [Under Development]
 IEC 61968-100 – Application Integration

Packages and objects for 61968
The CIM model defines the following packages and objects for DMS inline with 61968.
 Common
 ActivityRecord
 Agreement
 Document
 ElectronicAddress
 GeoLocation
 Location
 Organisation
 PositionPoint
 TelephoneNumber
 TimePoint
 TimeSchedule
 UserAttribute
 WiresExt
 DistributionLineSegment
 DistributionTapChanger
 DistributionTransformer
 DistributionTransformerWinding
 PerLengthPhaseImpedance
 Assets
 Asset
 AssetContainer
 AssetFunction
 ComMediaAsset
 ElectricalInfo
 Seal
 AssetModels
 AssetModel
 CableInfo
 ConcentricNeutralCableInfo
 ConductorInfo
 DistributionWindingTest
 EndDeviceModel
 OpenCircuitTest
 OverheadConductorInfo
 ShortCircuitTest
 TapeShieldCableInfo
 ToWindingSpec
 TransformerInfo
 WindingInfo
 WireArrangement
 WireType
 Work
 WorkKind
 Work
 Customers
 Customer
 CustomerAccount
 CustomerAgreement
 PricingStructure
 ServiceCategory
 ServiceLocation
 Tariff
 Metering
 ComFunction
 DemandResponseProgram
 DeviceFunction
 ElectricMeteringFunction
 EndDeviceAsset
 EndDeviceControl
 EndDeviceEvent
 EndDeviceGroup
 IntervalBlock
 IntervalReading
 MeterAsset
 MeterReading
 MeterServiceWork
 Pending
 Reading
 ReadingQuality
 ReadingType
 Register
 SDPLocation
 ServiceDeliveryPoint
 LoadControl
 RemoteConnectDisconnectInfo
 ConnectDisconnectFunction
 Payment Metering
 AccountMovement
 AccountingUnit
 BankAccountDetail
 Due
 LineDetail
 AuxiliaryAccount
 AuxiliaryAgreement
 Card
 Cashier
 CashierShift
 Charge
 Cheque
 ConsumptionTariffInterval
 MerchantAccount
 MerchantAgreement
 PointOfSale
 Receipt
 ServiceSupplier
 Shift
 TariffProfile
 Tender
 TimeTariffInterval
 Transaction
 Transactor
 Vendor
 VendorShift

See also
 IEC 61970
 MultiSpeak
 CIM
 IEC 61850

References

External links 
 
 CIM Users Group

61968
Smart grid